The Seattle, Lake Shore and Eastern Railway (SLS&E) was a railroad founded in Seattle, Washington, on April 28, 1885, with three tiers of purposes: Build and run the initial line to the town of Ballard, bring immediate results and returns to investors; exploit resources east in the valleys, foothills, Cascade Range, and Eastern Washington in 19th-century style, attracting more venture capital; and boost a link to a transcontinental railroad for Seattle, the ultimate prize for incorporation. The historical accomplishment of the line was Seattle to Sumas at the border, with British Columbia, Canada, connecting with the Canadian Pacific transcontinental at the border at Huntingdon, British Columbia, now part of the City of Abbotsford.

In addition to the historical accomplishment, the SLS&E built and ran branches from Seattle through Bothell, on to Woodinville, to Sallal Prairie (just past North Bend); Salmon Bay (the industrial district of the town of Ballard); and Spokane to Davenport.  Toward the latter end, one goal was creating a rail connection to North Dakota via Wallula, an outpost on the Columbia River in the early decades of railroad booms, near the present Tri-Cities. Local historian William Speidel reported that Henry Villard, tycoon of the Northern Pacific Railway (NP), had the federal rights and had the line through Wallula built.  The SLS&E was first incorporated to build a line from the Seattle harbor in old Downtown, along Elliott Bay to the lumber and fishing town of Ballard.

Subsequent to its abandonment in 1971, a southern portion of the railroad’s right-of-way re-opened in 1978 as the Burke-Gilman Trail.

Promoting a railroad empire involving Seattle

Railroading in Seattle closely paralleled development and early hopes for the future. Like communications networks today, 19th century railroading represented more than track, stock, and trade. Romantic and practical potential wooed communities across the West, much as Web commerce and bandwidth today (bandwidth was narrow, desire high, competition passionate). Travel between America's coasts had taken months, whether overland by wagon or by sailing ship or steamer around Cape Horn, until the Union Pacific reached San Francisco in 1869 and the Northern Pacific opened to Tacoma in 1887.

The SLS&E was conceived and financed by Seattle business interests in response to Villard of the NP selecting Seattle's intense rival Tacoma as its transcontinental western terminus, and incorporated on 15 April 1885. The original scheme for the SLS&E was connecting with an intercontinental railroad somewhere, while actually building north and east from Seattle. By the late 1880s, the SLS&E needed more capital for ongoing construction toward Sumas and an extension toward Spokane. The Seattle & Eastern Construction Company was formed with many of the same investors as the SLS&E. Construction of the eastern line began in Spokane. In 1890, the plans were amended to focus on connecting Seattle to the Canadian Pacific Railway at Sumas on the border.

Local historian William Speidel (1967) observed that,
At best, insider boosters had hoped they might get as far as Denny's Iron Mountain in Snoqualmie Pass. While the SLS&E was designed to connect with one of the other transcontinentals, its primary purpose lay in 19th-century industrial development exploiting the city's hinterland: the fast-disappearing easy timber, then primarily coal and iron. A theory, which later became profitable in fact, was that commuter trains could run along the SLS&E track, and be only twenty scenic minutes away from the center of the city. Ever since, every suburb around the perimeter of the city has been advertised as only "twenty scenic minutes away from downtown."

The Seattle, Lake Shore and Eastern Railroad was a pretty weak reed for Seattle to cling to. City boosters blew a lot of money on that railroad and when they were through, it had only been built as far east as Rattlesnake Prairie above Snoqualmie Falls and as for north as Arlington. But it was the only hope that Seattle-New York Alki held out for a connection with a transcontinental system. On the other hand, the side benefits of the SLS&E enabled boosters to hit the jackpot with the Great Northern.

The verso of a promotional print celebrating an opening excursion of the SLS&E stated, The Seattle Lake Shore and Eastern Railroad company was organized April 15, 1885 and was financed by local men and Jamieson, Smith and Cotting of New York. The first division of the road was to Issaquah where the coal mines would furnish cargoes. The first depot of the road was built at the foot of Columbia Street, but as space for trackage and terminals was too limited, the city created Railroad Avenue, 120 feet wide. The city gave the new road thirty feet of the Avenue for trackage and offered the Northern Pacific an equal amount which was not accepted. Construction was soon started from the eastern end of Spokane and forty miles of road built. Startled by the success of this competing line, the Northern Pacific purchased control and abandoned its fight against Seattle in 1890.  [The quote is text on the verso of a silver gelation print, "Excursion on the Seattle Lake Shore and Eastern Railroad, n.d.", A. Curtis 59932.]

"[A]ll along the line the road's construction caused a tremendous stir ... logging camps, mills, mines, and towns sprang into existence as if by magic."  The SLS&E boosted not only the town of Ballard (connected 1886), but new towns like Ross, Fremont, Latona (in what is now east Wallingford, Brooklyn (in what is now west University District), Yesler (now part of Laurelhurst), Bothell (Thanksgiving, 1887) and towns out to Gilman (now Issaquah).

The verso of a print in UW archives noted, August 20, 1894. Wreck on [the] Seattle, Lake Shore and Eastern just west of Latone [now Latona Avenue]. Freight train from Gilman [now Issaquah] hit a cow.  [Trainload was a] [m]ixer freight train, 10 co[a]l cars, logs and box cars. Train had slowed down at Brooklyn [Avenue] for cows. Engineer saw cows on a bank beyond Latona looking (?) one another[!]. One cow was tossed over [the] bank and hit the track just as [the] engine came by.  [The] [e]ngine was raised off the track[,] and when it came down [the] wheels went off the rails. Engineer reversed but [it] was too late.  [The] [c]oal tender shot ahead[,] tearing part of car [(the engine cab)] off and decapitating [the] fireman and killing [the] brakeman. Engineer and coal passer [were] unhurt. Steam and dust enveloped the derailed cars. Engineer ran to Fremont to telegraph to stop [the] evening passenger train[;] also [illegible] Engineer claimed train going 20 miles per hr.The streets at that time were rural, more tracks or plat lines than avenues. The run to Fremont Station was more than a mile (about 1.6 km). A small freight depot remains today at the foot of Stone Way N.

The Northern Pacific's View of the Lake Shore

Edwin Harrison McHenry, Receiver, St. Paul, Minnesota, to Edward Dean Adams, Chairman, New York City, April 10, 1896. (Courtesy J.R. Masters, Office Engineer, N.P. Ry., Ret., via Northern Pacific Collection at the Minnesota Historical Society.)

Transmitting report of [John William] Kendrick, General Manager, concerning the Seattle, Lake Shore and Eastern Railway (the Lake Shore).

You are already familiar with the general subject of the earlier financial transactions of this company. The record is a disgraceful one. Even before the acquisition of stock by the Northern Pacific, the enterprise appears to have been robbed by its promoters.

It was originally intended to complete the line across the Cascade Mountains to a connection with the Spokane Branch, but the amount realized from the sale of bonds being insufficient to defray the expensive construction work of the mountain section the line was not completed The cost of the portion constructed was considerably above the expected amount, and in order to raise more money, the company bonded a number of spurs and sidings.

Under ordinary circumstances it would have been expected that after the consummation of the sale of stock to the Northern Pacific, that the road would have been operated in the interests of the purchaser, but control was not secured until the Northern Pacific had paid for 80 [percent] of the stock, and in the interval the officials and others interest in the Lake Shore apparently devoted their time and attention to looting the property. The sale to our company was rushed through in a very peculiar manner, and without proper examination by the Traffic and Engineering departments of the Northern Pacific.

The specifications for the construction of the uncompleted portion of the line were accepted by our ex-General Counsel Mr. McNaught, and our Chief Engineer Mr. Kendrick was not allowed an opportunity to examine and comment on same. The worst feature, however, was the clause which provided that the track would be ballasted with adjacent material, instead of train-hauled gravel ballast. The soil is particularly wet, and a large portion of the line traverses muskeg swamps; this omission would be better understood by a physical examination of the line than words can convey. The natural surface was so bad that the construction company [was] forced to haul in ballast in order to get construction trains over the track.

After the Northern Pacific assumed control, it became necessary to incur great expenditures in providing additional sidings, spurs and other facilities for the ordinary transaction of business, and to perform additional ballasting.

The townsites along the line are held by the Virginia Townsite Company, under some deal engineer by the ex-general counsel, who subsequently unloaded same to the Northern Pacific. So valuable was the real estate supposed to be, that no extra width of right-of-way was provided at stations north of Sedro-Woolley, Washington.

A contract was also entered into for the benefit of the townsite interest at Anacortes, whereby the Northern Pacific agreed to operate the Seattle and Northern [a subsidiary of] the Oregon Improvement Company, paying [three percent] upon the appraised valuation, and a wheelage portion of expenses, in addition to a further sum of $80,000, expended in purchasing and interest in Syndicate Addition, and in the construction of improvements costing $35,000, entirely disconnected with the property of the Northern Pacific or the Lake Shore. The operation was shortly discontinued by the general manager on account of the heavy loss incurred, but the rental charges still continue to this day.

Valuable real estate at Seattle and at Snoqualmie Falls, which was formerly supposed to be property of the railroad, was claimed by private parties, and ownership of the Gilman coal mines at Issaquah, Washington, which were currently reported to have been paid for by the railroad, are in possession of outside interests.

Before the purchase by the Northern Pacific of the stock, the Lake Shore, finding it impossible to provide adequate terminal facilities at Spokane from the proceeds of [their] main line bonds, organized a company under the title of the Spokane Union Depot Company, to which the Washington and Idaho Railroad (a branch of the Union Pacific System), were admitted to half ownership. Bonds were issued amounting to a little over $400,000. The stock issue of $500,000 was divided equally between the two companies. The Lake Shore was reimbursed for the work on that portion of their main line within the limits of the depot grounds from the proceeds of the depot bonds, but to the best of my knowledge and belief, the railway bonds were never cancelled. This property I have nominally estimated at $600,000 ... but its real value is probably at least $1,000,000. It is used by the Oregon Railway and Navigation [Union Pacific] and the Great Northern systems, and these companies would have to expend at least $1,000,000 to provide equivalent facilities of less actual value. I have made repeated efforts for several years past to have this matter investigated, but owing to the circumstances have thus far been unsuccessful. If this depot stock does not come under the line of the Lake Shore bonds, it could doubtless be attached to satisfy some claims of the Northern Pacific against the Lake Shore.

The Spokane Branch is of little value, apart from the rails, which may be taken up and used elsewhere, with the exception of about two miles of line connecting with the Union Depot property, over which the Great Northern Railway now secures an entrance into Spokane from the west, and for the use of which they pay the heavy annual rental of $72,000.

On the Western Division, that portion of the line from Woodinville Junction to the terminus [at] Sallal near North Bend, Washington, is of little present value, but its earnings power will constantly increase. The remainder, which includes the section between Seattle and Woodinville Junction, and [Woodinville Junction] and the International boundary line at Sumas, Washington, I consider as very valuable property. Its present earnings afford no index to its prospective earnings in the future, and if it is not secured by our company at this time, the omission will be bitterly regretted.

The development of the region is necessarily slow, but I think it is also certain. There is every reason for expecting a steady and progressive increase in earnings for an indefinite period in the future. I am not in entire accord with the general manager's statement that the business secured from this branch may be replaced from points on our own lines. Contrary to the belief, the supplies of cedar in western Washington are comparatively limited, and the greatest reserves of this timber are along the line of the Lake Shore. I think it but a matter of a few years when the cedar will be exhausted on our other lines.

There is also reason to believe that the rate on shingles can be materially advanced without affecting the tonnage, as the present low price of the shingles is brought about wholly by local competition. It was not possible, however, to obtain a higher rate, except by concurrence of the Great Northern, which could not heretofore be obtained, on account of James Jerome Hill persistent effort to reduce the gross and net earnings of our system in order to facilitate his plans.

I understand the reorganization of the Lake Shore has been affected upon favorable terms, but have never had an opportunity to see the plan. I would every strongly recommend the purchase or least of the western divisions of the system, if favorable terms may be obtained. I would also advise the purchase of the Spokane Branch, if the property could be acquired upon satisfactory terms, which in my opinion would be based upon the value of that portion of the line within the city limits over which the Great Northern now gains access, including any liens the bonds may constitute upon the depot property, and the salvage value of the rails upon the remaining portion of the branch.

I further add, for your information, that I do not think the bondholders of the Lake Shore appreciate the fact that the bonds covering that portion of the line sold to the [Spokane Union] Depot Company were not cancelled, but I may be in error regarding this.

McNaught, James.

Counsel for Receivers.

Office: Postal Telegraph Building, New York, New York.

Born: September 9, 1842, at Lexington, McLane County, Illinois.

Education: Wesleyan University, Bloomington, Illinois.

Entered railway service: 1871 as director and counsel Columbia and Puget Sound; since which he has been consecutively 1879 to 1887, division counsel Northern Pacific, jurisdiction extending over Washington and Idaho, with headquarters at Seattle, Washington; 1887 to 1889, general solicitor, headquarters St. Paul, Minnesota; 1889 to October, 1893, general counsel same road; October, 1893, to May, 1895, counsel for receivers, same road.

Busbey, T. Addison, editor. The Biographical Directory of the Railway Officials of America, Edition of 1896. Chicago [Ill.]: Railway Age and Northwestern Railroader, 1896, p. 304.

McHenry, Edwin Harrison (January 25, 1859-August 21, 1931).
Fourth Vice-President New York, New Haven and Hartford Railroad and First Vice-President Consolidated Railway, Hartford, Connecticut.
Born: January 25, 1859, at Cincinnati, Ohio.
Educated: Pennsylvania Military College at Chester, Pennsylvania.
Entered railway service: 1883 as rodman on Black Hills Branch, Northern Pacific, since which he has been consecutively rodman, chainman, draftsman, leveler, transitman, assistant engineer, division engineer, principal assistant engineer, and November 1, 1893, to January 1, 1896, chief engineer; October, 1895, to October, 1896, also receiver same road; September 1, 1896, to September 1, 1901, chief engineer reorganized road, the Northern Pacific, in charge of location, construction and maintenance; 1901 and 1902, visited China, Japan and Philippine Islands; June 1, 1902, to May 10, 1904, chief engineer, Canadian Pacific; October 1, 1904, to date, first vice-president, Consolidated Railway, in charge of construction, operation and maintenance of the trolley lines owned by the New York, New Haven and Hartford, and also fourth vice-president, New York, New Haven and Hartford, in charge of Electrical Department covering electrical construction and maintenance of lines operated by electricity.
Busbey, T. Addison, editor. The Biographical Directory of the Railway Officials of America, Edition of 1906. Chicago [Ill.]: Railway Age, 1906, pp. 381-82.

Reorganization as the Northern Pacific's Seattle & International
Reorganized as the Seattle & International Railway in 1896 (incorporated June 30, 1896), the line leased the portion of the locally-legendary Everett and Monte Cristo Railway that ran from Everett east to Snohomish.  A  spur, Ballard Junction to Ballard is mentioned. The Northern Pacific acquired control February, 1898, succeeded the Seattle & International in 1901. The Northern Pacific operated the SLS&E from 15 March 1892 to 1 July 1893, when it was purchased by a reorganized SLS&E as the Seattle & International Railroad and Spokane & Seattle Railroad, Seattle & International Railway chartered 30 June 1898.

The SLS&E was placed in receivership on June 26, 1893, and was sold in foreclosure on May 16, 1896.  Speidel reported that Villard abruptly made a hostile takeover while the SLS&E was a going concern in 1890, in the midst of maneuvering among railroad business magnate Henry Villard of the Northern Pacific, James J. Hill of what became the Great Northern Railway, and the Seattle Establishment (1873–1900 and later).  Seattle DOT (Department of Transportation) reports the SLS&E was absorbed by the NP in 1892.  The lines in western Washington became the Seattle & International Railway Co., which was taken over by the Northern Pacific in 1901.

Building the SLS&E in Eastern Washington

The SLS&E was planned to be a larger railroad than it ultimately became. Construction was in two parts, with the eastern Washington section started in Spokane and headed west, begun in the late 1880s by largely the same group of investors incorporating the Seattle & Eastern Construction Company.

An old map shows the proposed line going from Davenport to Coulee City, up the Grand Coulee to Waterville, then on to Wenatchee, then along the Wenatchee River, and up over part of Stevens Pass then over toward Everett.  With what is known today about Cascade Range topography that was little-known or unknown back then, how much was promotion and how much was actually expected according to the insiders' business plan remains part of the intrigue of railroad history.

The steam locomotive "A. M. Cannon." SLS&E number 11, was named after a prominent Spokane resident.  Cannon was very instrumental in the building of the SLS&E in the Spokane area.

It has been reported that the Great Northern (GN) used the SLS&E bridge over the Spokane River while the GN was building its own during its transcontinental construction in 1893.

The eastern Washington line became the Spokane & Seattle Railway, which was purchased by the NP in two parts. The first—Medical Lake to Davenport—was purchased in 1899. The remainder, between Medical Lake and Spokane, was bought in 1900.

Recent history
The western Washington lines remained in fairly heavy use until 1963. By 1970, most of the line was acquired by Burlington Northern Railway which filed to abandon the lines a year later in 1971. The bike path and rail trail has been extended along the SLS&E line west through Interbay, and extending east from Jerry Wilmot Park, South Woodinville, the King County Regional Trail system
leads to the cross-state John Wayne Pioneer Trail. A  section of the railway, between Snoqualmie Falls and North Bend, was preserved in 1975, and is now owned and operated by the Northwest Railway Museum.

In eastern Washington, the Northern Pacific abandoned the section between Spokane and Medical Lake right after purchase, preferring to use their own branch from Spokane, the Central Washington Branch (CW Branch). The section from Medical Lake to Davenport was operated for a time before the line was trimmed back to include only an  spur out of Davenport to Eleanor. The Washington Water Power Company purchased the right-of-way between Spokane and Medical Lake from the Northern Pacific on or about 2 March 1904, for use as an interurban passenger railway. It remained in use as an interurban until early 1922, before the rails were torn up again. The only remaining eastern Washington section by 1970 was the spur out of Davenport that ran to Eleanor, abandoned in 1983. As of May 2019 the only remaining section is the Wye going south of Davenport; it is now used to turn locomotives around and storage for the Washington Eastern Railroad.

The right-of-way has long since reverted to adjacent landowners and has been used for other purposes, having been abandoned 1922–1983. If these lines had been operated in a more urban setting, and in more recent times, they might have been converted to use today as a trail. But at the time this line was abandoned, the rails to trails movement had not begun. By today much of the lines in the open country of Eastern Washington have gone the way of the "disappearing railroad blues." Some sections can still be seen, but otherwise much of it has become roadways or disappeared into history.

See also
Burke-Gilman Trail
Iron Horse State Park
Dr. Thomas T. Minor
Eastside Rail Corridor
Woodinville Subdivision

References

Bibliography
 
   in "Museum Description". See Bibliography for "References" cited in "Collection".  "References" Snoqualmie Valley Community Plan, City of Snoqualmie Comprehensive Plan, Mountains to Sound Greenway Vision, Recreation in a Rural Economy; Washington State Parks.
   Negative Number: A. Curtis 59932  Text on verso of image, silver gelation print. Repository Collection: Asahel Curtis Photo Co. Collection. PH Coll 482.  
   Handwritten on mount: "Lake Shore & Eastern R.R. opening."  Magic lantern slide, scanned to TIFF image, manipulated to JPEG quality measurement 3. Repository: Museum of History & Industry, Seattle (MOHAI), image number 2002.3.936  (2.1) Identical image to Negative Number: A. Curtis 59932 (of silver gelatin print).  (3)  SLS&E opened c. 1887, bought out c. 1894. Copyrights expired on both: First published in the U.S. before 1923.
   North Central Regional Library 385.097 ARMBRUS
 2d edition of vol. I of III
   Seattle Public Library and King County Library System each have several reference-only copies.  This has been reported to be a source, but the book has not yet been located for page numbers and verification by a Wikipedia editor.
   Downin, Dave, curator
   MacIntosh & Crowley referenced Carlos Schwantes, Railroad Signatures Across the Pacific Northwest (Seattle: University of Washington Press, 1993), pp. 50, 52–53, 132–136, 226; Clarence Bagley, History of King County Washington (Chicago-Seattle: S. J. Clarke Publishing Co., 1929), pp. 243, 245; Robert C. Nesbit, He Built Seattle: A Biography of Judge Thomas Burke (Seattle: University of Washington Press, 1961), pp. 35, 236; Reginald H. Thomson, That Man Thomson (Seattle: University of Washington Press, 1950), pp. 49–56.  Well-written, nuanced article.
   MacIntosh referenced Clarence Bagley, History of Seattle, (Chicago: S. J. Clarke Publishing Company, 1916), pp. 248–252 [Bagley is "known for enhancing local history" {article}]; Schwantes, Carlos, Railroad Signatures Across the Pacific Northwest, (Seattle: University of Washington Press, 1993); Maury Klein, Union Pacific: The Birth of a Railroad, 1862-1893, (Garden City, New York: Doubleday & Company, 1987), pp. 581–582.
 Martin, Dale Jr. (updated 25 April 2006). "Issaquah Railway History Chronology", "Issaquah Depot Museum". Issaquah Historical Society. Retrieved 21 April 2006. The list referenced Renz, Louis Tuck (1980). The History of the Northern Pacific Railroad. Fairfield, Washington: Ye Galleon Press. ; as well as Burlington Northern Railroad, The Seattle Times, and author notes.
 
 
   Refers to: "P1901 PMRL2 See Poor's 1896P334"; "For History see Poor's 1894"; "JUNE 1893 RAILWAY GUIDE Seattle, Washington".
   Refers to: "Poor's 1899P653"; "P1901 PMRL2"
 
   North Central Regional Library 385.0657 RENZ
   Seattle Public Library REF 385.0979 ROBERTS
   Seattle Public Library 979.7 R838R, R979.7 R838R Brooks Library, Central Washington University, Ellensburg; Book, Special Coll fourth Floor - "F891 R92", Microfiche third Floor - "MH-351".
 Seattle Post-Intelligencer newspaper, 1885–1896.
 
   Speidel includes an extensive bibliography with a substantial proportion primary sources.
   Quoted text is from the verso of the original paper print, verbatim but for grammar in square brackets.  Copyright expired: First published in the U.S. before 1923.

Further reading

 

Defunct Washington (state) railroads
History of Seattle
Predecessors of the Northern Pacific Railway
Railway companies established in 1885
Railway companies disestablished in 1896
1885 establishments in Washington Territory
1896 disestablishments in Washington (state)